The Pasig River is a water body in the Philippines that connects Laguna de Bay to Manila Bay. Its major tributaries are the Marikina River and San Juan River.

The Pasig River is technically a tidal estuary, as the flow direction depends upon the water level difference between Manila Bay and Laguna de Bay. During the dry season, the water level in Laguna de Bay is low with the river's flow direction dependent on the tides. During the wet season, when the water level of Laguna de Bay is high, the flow is reversed towards Manila Bay.

The Pasig River used to be an important transport route and source of water for Spanish Manila. Due to negligence and industrial development, the river suffered a rapid decline in the second half of the 20th century and was declared biologically dead in 1990. Two decades later after that declaration, however, a renaturation program designed to revive the river has seen the return of life to the river, including eight fish species, 39 species of birds, and 118 species of trees and other vegetation. As a result, the Pasig River received the Asian River Prize by the International River Foundation (IRF) in 2019

The Pasig River Rehabilitation Commission (PRRC) was a Philippine government agency established to oversee rehabilitation efforts for the river from 1999 until it was abolished in November 2019. Rehabilitation efforts are also aided by private sector organizations, such as the Clean and Green Foundation, Inc., which ran the Piso para sa Pasig (Filipino: "A peso for the Pasig") campaign in the 1990s.

Etymology 

The river takes its name from the city of Pasig, which is named after the Tagalog word pasig, meaning "a river that flows into the sea" or "the sandy bank of a river", with the former in reference to the Pasig River's flow from Laguna de Bay towards Manila Bay and out into the South China Sea.

Geography 
From the lake, the river runs between Taguig and Taytay, Rizal, before entering Pasig. This portion of the Pasig River, to the confluence with the Marikina River tributary, is known as the Napindan River or Napindan Channel.

From there, the Pasig forms flows through Pasig until its confluence with the Taguig River, From here, it forms the border between Mandaluyong to the north and Makati to the south. The river then sharply turns northeast, where it has become the border between Mandaluyong and Manila before turning again westward, joining its other major tributary, the San Juan River, and then following a sinuous path through the center of Manila before emptying into the bay.

The whole river and most portions of its tributaries lie entirely within Metro Manila, the metropolitan region of the capital. Isla de Convalecencia, the only island dividing the Pasig River, can be found in Manila and is where the Hospicio de San Jose is located.

Tributaries and canals 
One major river that drains Laguna de Bay is the Taguig River, which enters into Taguig before becoming the Pateros River; it is the border between the municipalities of Pateros and Makati. The Pateros River then enters the confluence where the Napindan Channel and Marikina River meet. The Marikina River is the larger of the two major tributaries of the Pasig River, and it flows southward from the mountains of Rizal and cuts through the Marikina Valley. The San Juan River drains the plateau on which Quezon City stands; its major tributary is Diliman Creek.

Within the city of Manila, various esteros (canals) criss-cross through the city and connect with the Tullahan River in the north and the Parañaque River to the west.

Crossings 

A total of 21 bridges currently cross the Pasig. The first bridge from the source at Laguna de Bay is the Napindan Bridge, followed by the Arsenio Jimenez Bridge to its west. Crossing the Napindan Channel in Pasig is the Bambang Bridge. The newest bridge, opened in February 2015, is the Kaunlaran Bridge that connects barangays  and Sumilang in Pasig.

The next bridge downstream is the C.P. Garcia Bridge carrying C-5 Road and connecting the cities of Makati and Pasig. It is followed by the Sta. Monica–Lawton Bridge, the newest bridge opened in June 2021 that connects Lawton Avenue in Makati to Fairlane Street in Pineda, Pasig as part of the Bonifacio Global City–Ortigas Link Road project approved in 2015.

The Guadalupe Bridge between Makati and Mandaluyong carries Epifanio de los Santos Avenue, the major artery of Metro Manila, as well as the MRT Line 3 from Guadalupe station to Boni station. The Estrella–Pantaleon and Makati–Mandaluyong Bridges likewise connect the two cities downstream, with the latter forming the end of Makati Avenue.

The easternmost crossing in Manila is Lambingan Bridge in the district of Santa Ana. It is then followed by the Padre Zamora (Pandacan) Bridge connecting Pandacan and Santa Mesa districts, and carries the southern line of the Philippine National Railways. The expressway bridge of Skyway Stage 3, serving as a connection road between the North Luzon Expressway and the South Luzon Expressway, is built near the mouth of the San Juan River where most parts of it is built and another bridge parallel to Padre Zamora and PNR bridges will be built to merge with NLEX Connector in Santa Mesa; it will thus serve as a solution to heavy traffic along EDSA. The Mabini Bridge (formerly Nagtahan Bridge) provides a crossing for Nagtahan Street, part of C-2 Road. Ayala Bridge carries Ayala Boulevard, and connects the Isla de Convalecencia to both banks of the Pasig.

Further downstream are the Quezon Bridge from Quiapo to Ermita, the Line 1 bridge from Central Terminal station to Carriedo station, MacArthur Bridge from Santa Cruz to Ermita, and the Jones Bridge from Binondo to Ermita. The last bridge near the mouth of the Pasig is the Roxas Bridge (also known as M. Lopez Bridge and formerly called Del Pan Bridge) from San Nicolas to the Port Area and Intramuros.

Landmarks 
The growth of Manila along the banks of the Pasig River has made it a focal point for development and historical events. The foremost landmark on the banks of the river is the walled district of Intramuros, located near the mouth of the river on its southern bank. It was built by the Spanish colonial government in the 16th century. Further upstream is the Hospicio de San Jose, an orphanage located on Pasig's sole island, the Isla de Convalescencia. On the northern bank stands the Quinta Market in Quiapo, Manila's central market, and Malacañan Palace, the official residence of the President of the Philippines. Also on the Pasig River's northern bank and within the Manila district of Sta. Mesa is the main campus of the Polytechnic University of the Philippines.

In Makati, along the southern bank of Pasig, is Circuit Makati (the former Sta. Ana Race Track) and the Rockwell Center, a high-end office and commercial area containing the Power Plant Mall. At the confluence of the Pasig and Marikina rivers is the Napindan Hydraulic Control Structure, which regulates the flow of water from the Napindan Channel.

Geographical landmarks 
The third chapter of Jose Rizal's novel El filibusterismo mentions several stories surrounding certain geographical features along the Pasig River during the Spanish colonial era, such as the Buwayang Bato, the Malapd na Bato, and Doña Geromina's Cave.

Doña Geromina's Cave, according to legend, was built by the Archbishop of Manila as a sanctuary for his former lover. The cave is believed to be located in Barangay Pineda, Pasig under the Bagong Ilog bridge carrying Circumferential Road 5 between Pasig and Makati.

Malapad na Bato
In Makati, a cliff along the river is known as Malapad-na-bato, which was considered to be sacred to the early Tagalog people as a home to spirits. After the Nuestra Señora de Gracia Church was completed in 1630, it eventually became a pilgrimage site for newly converted Christians, resulting in a decline in the importance of Malapad-na-bató as a religious site. It was mentioned in El Filibusterismo that the sacred character of the site disappeared as fears of the spirits living there had disappeared after the cliff was inhabited by bandits.

Buwayang Bato
The Buwayang Bato is a rock formation that allegedly resembled a large crocodile. In El Filibusterismo,the legend tells a story of a rich Chinese man who did not believe in Catholicism that boasted of not being afraid of crocodiles. One day, while trading on the river, the man was attacked by a large crocodile. It was said that after the Chinese man prayed to San Nicholas for mercy, the crocodile turned into stone. The rock formation is believed to be located at the southeastern shore of Mandaluyong, in the namesake barangay of Buayang Bato.

Geology 

The Pasig River's main watershed is concentrated in the plains between Manila Bay and Laguna de Bay. The watershed of the Marikina River tributary mostly occupies the Marikina Valley, which was formed by the Marikina Fault Line. The Manggahan Floodway is an artificially constructed waterway that aims to reduce the flooding in the Marikina Valley during the rainy season, by bringing excess water to Laguna de Bay.

Tidal flows 
The Pasig River is technically considered a tidal estuary. Toward the end of the summer or dry season (April and May), the water level in Laguna de Bay reaches to a minimum of 10.5 meters. During times of high tide, the water level in the lake may drop below that of Manila Bay's, resulting in a reverse flow of seawater from the bay into the lake. This results in increased pollution and salinity levels in Laguna de Bay at this time of the year.

Flooding 
The Pasig River is vulnerable to flooding in times of very heavy rainfall, with the Marikina River tributary the main source of the floodwater. The Manggahan Floodway was constructed to divert excess floodwater from the Marikina River into Laguna de Bay, which serves as a temporary reservoir. By design, the Manggahan Floodway is capable of handling 2,400 cubic meters per second of water flow, with the actual flow being about 2,000 cubic meters per second. To complement the floodway, the Napindan Hydraulic Control System (NHCS) was built in 1983 at the confluence of the Marikina River and the Napindan Channel to regulate the flow of water between the Pasig River and the lake.

History 

The Pasig River served as an important means of transport; it was Manila's lifeline and center of economic activity. Some of the most prominent kingdoms in early Philippine history, including the kingdoms of Namayan, Maynila, and Tondo grew up along the banks of the river, drawing their life and source of wealth from it. When the Spanish established Manila as the capital of their colonial properties in the Far East, they built the walled city of Intramuros on the southern bank of the Pasig River near its mouth.

Pollution 

After World War II, massive population growth, infrastructure construction, and the dispersal of economic activities to Manila's suburbs left the river neglected. The banks of the river attracted informal settlers and the remaining factories dumped their wastes into the river, making it effectively a huge sewer system. Industrialization had already polluted the river.

In the 1930s, observers noticed the increasing pollution of the river, as fish migration from Laguna de Bay diminished. People ceased using the river's water for laundering in the 1960s, and ferry transport declined. By the 1970s, the river started to emanate offensive smells, and in the 1980s, fishing in the river was prohibited. In 1990, the Pasig River was considered biologically dead by the Danish International Development Agency.

It is estimated that about 60-65 percent of the pollution in the Pasig River comes from household waste disposed into the tributaries of the river. Increasing poverty in the rural areas in Philippines has driven migration to Metro Manila in search of better opportunities. This resulted in rapid urban growth, congestion and overcrowding of land and along the riverbanks, making the river and its tributaries a dumping ground for informal settlers living there. 
About 30–35 percent of the river pollution is generated from industries locating close to the river (such as tanneries, textile mills, food processing plants, distilleries, and chemical and metal plants), some of which do not have water treatment facilities which are capable of removing heavy metal pollutants. The rest of the pollutants consist of solid waste dumped into the rivers. Metro Manila has been reported to produce as much as 7,000 tons of garbage per day. In a study conducted by the researchers from Polytechnic University of the Philippines, the river is also contaminated with microplastics.

Rehabilitation efforts 

Efforts to revive the river began in December 1989 with the help of Danish authorities. The Pasig River Rehabilitation Program (PRRP) was established, with the Department of Environment and Natural Resources (DENR) as the main agency with the coordination of the Danish International Development Assistance (DANIDA).

In 1999, President Joseph Estrada signed Executive Order No. 54 establishing the Pasig River Rehabilitation Commission (PRRC) to replace the old PRRP with additional expanded powers such as managing of wastes and resettling of squatters. The PRRC was abolished in November 2019, with its functions and powers being transferred to the Manila Bay Task Force, DENR, Department of Housing and Urban Development, Metropolitan Manila Development Authority (MMDA), and the Department of Public Works and Highways (DPWH).

In 2010, the TV network ABS-CBN and PRRC headed by ABS-CBN Foundation-Bantay Kalikasan Director Gina Lopez – currently serving as a chairperson of PRRC – launched a fun run fund-raising activity called "Run for the Pasig River" held every month of October. The proceeds from the fun run will serve as a fund for the "Kapit-bisig para sa Ilog Pasig" (Collaborate for the Pasig River) rehabilitation project of the Pasig River.

In October 2018, the PRRC won the first Asia Riverprize, in recognition of its efforts to rehabilitate the Pasig River. According to the PRRC, aquatic life has returned to the river.

On April 20, 2021, San Miguel Corporation announced that the river cleanup will begin in May 2021. SMC will also work with the DENR and the DPWH in this river cleanup. The river cleanup is part of San Miguel Corporation's ₱95-billion Pasig River Expressway project.

Gallery

See also 
 List of rivers and esteros in Manila
 1968 Casiguran earthquake
 Laguna de Bay
 Manila Bay
 Marikina River
 Pasig River Ferry Service

References

External links 

 Philippine Information Agency article on the Pasig River
 Pasig River Rehabilitation Commission
 Iloilo River

 
Rivers of Metro Manila
Rivers of the Philippines
Tributaries of Laguna de Bay